This is a list of destinations that Midwest Connect, operated by Chautauqua Airlines for Midwest Airlines served as of April 2010.

United States

Indiana
 Indianapolis (Indianapolis International Airport)

Iowa
 Des Moines (Des Moines International Airport)

Kentucky
 Louisville (Louisville International Airport)

Michigan
 Flint (Bishop International Airport)
 Grand Rapids (Gerald R. Ford International Airport)

Minnesota
 Minneapolis/Saint Paul (Minneapolis-Saint Paul International Airport)

Missouri
 Kansas City (Kansas City International Airport) Secondary Hub
 St. Louis (Lambert-St. Louis International Airport)

Nebraska
 Omaha (Eppley Airfield) (focus city)

Ohio
 Cleveland (Cleveland Hopkins International Airport)
 Columbus (Port Columbus International Airport)
 Dayton (James M. Cox Dayton International Airport)

Pennsylvania
 Pittsburgh (Pittsburgh International Airport)

Tennessee
 Nashville (Nashville International Airport)

Wisconsin
 Appleton (Outagamie County Regional Airport)
 Green Bay (Austin Straubel International Airport)
 Madison (Dane County Regional Airport)
 Milwaukee (General Mitchell International Airport) (Hub)

External links
 Midwest Airlines

Lists of airline destinations